Ulysses Grant Denman (November 26, 1866 – October 30, 1962) was a Republican politician from the state of Ohio. He was Ohio Attorney General from 1908-1911 .

Denman was born November 24, 1866 at Willshire, Ohio. Graduated from the public schools of Willshire, National Normal University, Lebanon, Ohio, and Northern Indiana Normal School, Valparaiso, Indiana. He was named Superintendent of the Public Schools of Willshire in 1889, which he retained for three years. He then entered law school in 1892. He graduated from the University of Michigan Law School in 1894. He was admitted to the Ohio bar in 1894, and to practice at the United States Supreme Court in 1904.

Denman was married to Francis May Neptune on December 26, 1890, and had one daughter. He was a Methodist by faith, and member of BPOE. He practiced law in Toledo, Ohio.

Denman was Assistant City Solicitor of Toledo 1899-1901, and represented Lucas County in the Ohio House of Representatives in the 65th General Assembly, 1902-1903. He was elected as a Republican to State Attorney General in 1908. November 6, 1908, Attorney General Wade H. Ellis resigned, and Denman was appointed by Governor Harris to fill the interim until his two-year term began January, 1909. He was appointed United States District Attorney for the Northern District of Ohio in 1911, resigning in 1914.

Denman died in 1962 at a nursing home.

Notes

References

External links

1866 births
1961 deaths
Politicians from Toledo, Ohio
Ohio Attorneys General
Ohio lawyers
Republican Party members of the Ohio House of Representatives
National Normal University alumni
University of Michigan Law School alumni
People from Van Wert County, Ohio
Valparaiso University alumni
United States Attorneys for the Northern District of Ohio
Lawyers from Toledo, Ohio